Tarutoko Dam  is a gravity dam located in Hiroshima Prefecture in Japan. The dam is used for power production. The catchment area of the dam is 39.5 km2. The dam impounds about 180  ha of land when full and can store 20600 thousand cubic meters of water. The construction of the dam was completed in 1957.

References

Dams in Hiroshima Prefecture
Dams completed in 1957
Ōta River